Lorraine Catchings Dulaney (December 25, 1863 - November 30, 1945) was an American planter and Democratic politician. He served in both houses of the Mississippi State Legislature in the late 19th and early 20th centuries.

Biography 
Lorraine Catchings Dulaney was born on December 25, 1863, in Madison County, Mississippi. He was the son of William Johnson Dulaney and his wife, Lorraine (Catchings) Dulaney. He was of French  descent. Dulaney attended the public schools of Madison County, and graduated from Poughkeepsie Business College in New York in 1882. Dulaney was a planter, merchant, and railroad and levee contractor. A Democrat, he represented Issaquena County in the Mississippi House of Representatives from 1892 to 1896. From 1900 to 1904, he represented the 20th District in the Mississippi State Senate. In November 1903, he was elected to another term in the House and served from 1904 to 1908. He served again in the Senate in the same district from 1916 to 1920.

Dulaney died on November 30, 1945, at his home in Grace, Mississippi.

Bribery charges 
In 1910, Dulaney was charged for attempting to bribe state senator Theodore G. Bilbo to vote for LeRoy Percy for the U. S. Senate. Dulaney was acquitted.

References 

1863 births
1945 deaths
People from Issaquena County, Mississippi
Democratic Party members of the Mississippi House of Representatives
Democratic Party Mississippi state senators
American planters